The Sappa Formation is a geologic formation in Nebraska. It preserves fossils.

See also

 List of fossiliferous stratigraphic units in Nebraska
 Paleontology in Nebraska

References
 

Paleogene geology of Nebraska
Cretaceous System of North America